Dan Gordon may refer to:

Sportspeople
 Dan Gordon (Scottish footballer) (1881–1958), Scottish footballer
 Dan Gordon (Gaelic footballer), Gaelic football player from County Down, Northern Ireland

Others
 Dan Gordon (actor) (born 1961), Northern Irish actor
 Dan Gordon (animator) (died 1969), writer and director of cartoons
 Dan Gordon (Charmed), character in the television series Charmed
 Dan Gordon (screenwriter), writer of screenplays for films such as The Hurricane
 Dan Gordon, co-founder and original brewmaster for Gordon Biersch Brewing Company
 Dan Gordon, the current Mayor of Waimakariri, in New Zealand

See also
 Daniel Gordon (disambiguation)